Köhler's Medicinal Plants (or, Köhler's Medizinal-Pflanzen) is a German herbal written principally by Hermann Adolph Köhler (1834 - 1879, physician and chemist), and edited after his death by Gustav Pabst. The work was first published in the late 19th century by Franz Eugen Köhler of Gera.

Publication history
Originally, Köhler published the herbal in two volumes: the first in 1887, the second in 1890. Volume one is illustrated with 84 full-page, multi-colour plates, and volume two with 110. A third volume was added in 1898, entitled Neueste Medizinalpflanzen und Verwechslungen, which is a supplement containing additions and corrections. Among the additions are 80 more colour plates. A fourth volume was announced by the publisher, but never released. All the colour plates in the herbal were produced through a process called chromolithography. The botanical illustrators were Walther Otto Müller, C. F. Schmidt, and K. Gunther.

A reprint was published in Germany a century after the original, first of extracts of the work, later the complete three volumes.

The name Köhler is sometimes corrupted to Koehler or Kohler.

Because of the identical names of first author and publisher, frequently Franz Eugen Köhler is erroneously mentioned as the author of the book.

Illustration samples

Reprint editions
 Reprint von Auszügen aus dem Gesamtwerk nach der zweibändigen Original-Ausgabe 1887/88[recte 90]. Edition Libri rari im Verlag Schäfer, Hannover 1988, .
 Zweite Reprintausgabe. Edition Libri rari im Verlag Schäfer, Hannover:
 1. Band, 1990, .
 2. Band, 1990, .
 3. Band, 1991, .

References

 Read and download Köhler's Medizinal-Pflanzen at Biodiversity Heritage Library
 Illustratedgarden.org

External links

1887 non-fiction books
Herbals
1887 in science
Medicinal plants
Botany handbooks and guides
German non-fiction books